Galperin is an (Eastern) Jewish surname, derived from Heilprin / Halperin. Notable people with the surname include:

 Eva Galperin, director of cybersecurity at the Electronic Frontier Foundation (EFF)
 Evsey Iosifovich Galperin (1920—1990), Soviet geophysicist, inventor of the symmetric triaxial seismometer design (Galperin configuration)
 Gleb Galperin (born 1985), Russian diver who competed in the 2004, 2008 and 2012 Summer Olympics
 Marcos Galperin (born 1971), Argentine businessman
 Mark Galperin (born 1968 or 1969), Russian political activist
 Ron Galperin (born 1963), American politician and lawyer

See also 
 
 
 Gelperin, a list of people with a similar surname also derived from Heilprin
 Galperina, a list of people with the surname